The ancient Egyptian Sail hieroglyph is Gardiner sign listed no. P5 for the sail of a ship. The hieroglyph shows a hoisted sail, curved because of wind filling it. It is  used in Egyptian hieroglyphs as a determinative for words related to wind, air, breath, sailors, (as "nefu"), floods-(of the Nile), etc. Also an ideogram in 'puff', 'wind', Egyptian ṯꜣw.

Breath, in the Book of the Dead
Because of the use of the word 'winds', the 'breath' concept became an equally important usage of the sail hieroglyph. The Nile current carried ships downstream-(north), but sometimes prevailing, or advantageous winds allowed upstream travel on the Nile.

A replacement of the sekhem scepter held in the hand in vignettes from the Books of the Dead refers to obtaining life-giving 'breath' in the afterlife. An example is Nakht, (Papyrus of Nakht, 18th-19th Dynasty), holding a large mast-on-a-staff, referring to Spell 38A, for living by air in the realm of the dead. Other stick figured caricature examples show the mast and an ankh in each hand, both signifying a "breath (of) life".

Other spells in the Book of the Dead use the concept of 'breath' in even more storied forms and involving various gods.

See also
Gardiner's Sign List#P. Ships and Parts of Ships
List of Egyptian hieroglyphs

References

Betrò, 1995. Hieroglyphics: The Writings of Ancient Egypt, Betrò, Maria Carmela, c. 1995, 1996-(English), Abbeville Press Publishers, New York, London, Paris (hardcover)
Wilkinson, 1992. Reading Egyptian Art: A Hieroglyphic Guide to Ancient Egyptian Painting and Sculpture, Richard H. Wilkinson, c 1992, 1994, Section: Seth Animal, p. 66-67. Thames and Hudson; abbreviated Index, 224 pp. (softcover)

Egyptian hieroglyphs: ships and parts of ships

Egyptian hieroglyphs: arts and trades